The Dutch Men's Volleyball Eredivisie is a men's volleyball competition organized by the Dutch Volleyball Association (Nevobo), it was created in 1948.

History 
The Eredivisie Volleyball League in 2020/21 involved 10 teams: "Draysma-Dynamo" ( Apeldoorn ), "Likurgus" ( Groningen ), "Orion" ( Doetinchem ), "Sliedrecht Sport" ( Sliedrecht ) RECO ( Zevenhoyzen ), "Taurus -Huten ”( Heerlen ), VoKASA ( Nijmegen ),“ Papendal ”( Arnhem ),“ Bildermann-Kutsier ”( Barneveld ), VKN ( Capelle aan den IJssel ). The champion's title was won by Dreisma-Dynamo, which won the final series beating Lycurgus 2-1 (2: 3, 3: 1, 3: 1). 3rd place was taken by Orion.

Winners list

References

External links
 www.volleybal.nl
  volleyballstatistieken.nl

Netherlands
Sports leagues established in 1948
1948 establishments in the Netherlands
Volleyball in the Netherlands
Professional sports leagues in the Netherlands